Sportitalia 24 was an Italian sports channel, the third owned by LT Multimedia after Sportitalia.

It was broadcast FTA on DTT in Italy channel 62 on Mux Tivuitalia, a company of Screen Service group and on Mux TIMB 2, a company of Telecom Italia Media group. It is also available on SKY Italia and on IPTV.

It was launched as sports-news channel on 10 June 2010.

External links
Official website 

Italian-language television stations
Television channels and stations established in 2010
Sports television in Italy
Television channels and stations disestablished in 2013
Defunct television channels in Italy
2010 establishments in Italy
2013 disestablishments in Italy